Fronton may refer to:
Fronton (court), a playing area for Basque pelota
Fronton, Haute-Garonne, a commune in Haute-Garonne, France
Fronton, Texas, a small community in Starr County, Texas
Paleta Frontón, a Peruvian sport
 Frontón, Ciales, Puerto Rico, a barrio
El Frontón, a Peruvian island
One-Wall Handball, a ball game also called International Fronton